Valenzuela City Convention Center is a convention center located in Valenzuela in Metro Manila, Philippines. It is well known among the citizens of Valenzuela as its center for the performing arts, as well as a popular venue for concerts, art shows and exhibits, and conventions.

See also
 Museo Valenzuela

References

External links

 Official website of Valenzuela City

Convention and exhibition centers in Metro Manila
Buildings and structures in Valenzuela, Metro Manila